Ladbrooks is a locality in Canterbury, New Zealand. It is named after William and Eliza Ladbrook, who moved to the area in 1842 on the boat the Birman.

Ladbrooks Hall, built in 1913, was substantially extended in the 1960s.

Demographics 

Ladbrooks had a population of 1,701 at the 2018 New Zealand census, an increase of 123 people (7.8%) since the 2013 census, and an increase of 402 people (30.9%) since the 2006 census. There were 564 households. There were 861 males and 837 females, giving a sex ratio of 1.03 males per female. The median age was 45.0 years (compared with 37.4 years nationally), with 303 people (17.8%) aged under 15 years, 324 (19.0%) aged 15 to 29, 798 (46.9%) aged 30 to 64, and 273 (16.0%) aged 65 or older.

Ethnicities were 97.0% European/Pākehā, 5.1% Māori, 0.5% Pacific peoples, 1.8% Asian, and 1.4% other ethnicities (totals add to more than 100% since people could identify with multiple ethnicities).

The proportion of people born overseas was 16.0%, compared with 27.1% nationally.

Although some people objected to giving their religion, 52.2% had no religion, 39.2% were Christian, 0.4% were Buddhist and 0.9% had other religions.

Of those at least 15 years old, 384 (27.5%) people had a bachelor or higher degree, and 183 (13.1%) people had no formal qualifications. The median income was $38,900, compared with $31,800 nationally. The employment status of those at least 15 was that 705 (50.4%) people were employed full-time, 303 (21.7%) were part-time, and 39 (2.8%) were unemployed.

Education
Ladbrooks School is a full primary school catering for years 1 to 8.

References

External links

Selwyn District
Populated places in Canterbury, New Zealand